ARA Indómita (P-86) is an  of the Argentine Navy. The vessel has a twin sister ship, . It is the first Argentine ship to bear the name.

The vessel was reported active as of 2022. In October 2022 it was reported that Indómita had received an upgrade incorporating a Stabilized Naval Observation and Marksmanship System (SEON) to enhance her surveillance capabilities.

References 

Indómita
Ships built in Bremen (state)
1974 ships